I'm Beginning to See the Light is an album by saxophonist Buck Hill which was recorded in 1991 and released on the Muse label.

Reception

The AllMusic review by Scott Yanow stated "A thick-toned tenor, Hill has a style that is boppish and looks both toward swing and hard bop simultaneously. Joined by a fine, if obscure, Washington-based rhythm section, Hill performs five of his basic originals and four standards on this date ... an excellent example of Hill's musical talents".

Track listing
All compositions by Buck Hill except where noted
 "Blue Hill" – 3:53
 "Lullaby of Loosdrecht" – 7:52
 "Mitzi" – 4:32
 "Bossa for Sax" – 8:55
 "I'm Beginning to See the Light" (Duke Ellington, Don George, Johnny Hodges, Harry James) – 5:16	
 "But Beautiful" (Jimmy Van Heusen, Johnny Burke) – 8:25
 "I Want to Be Happy" (Vincent Youmans, Irving Caesar) – 3:26	
 "Warm Valley" (Ellington) – 3:26
 "Blues in Five for Four or More" – 4:08

Personnel
Buck Hill – tenor saxophone
Jon Ozment – piano 
Carroll Dashiell – bass 
Warren Shadd – drums

References

Muse Records albums
Buck Hill (musician) albums
1992 albums